David Tappan (1752–1803) was an American theologian. He occupied the Hollis Chair at Harvard Divinity School until his death in 1803. He was elected a Fellow of the American Academy of Arts and Sciences in 1796.  He graduated from Harvard University in 1771.

References

1752 births
1803 deaths
American theologians
Fellows of the American Academy of Arts and Sciences
Harvard Divinity School faculty
Harvard University alumni